Events from the 1540s in England.

Incumbents
 Monarch – Henry VIII (until 28 January 1547), then Edward VI 
 Regent – Catherine, Queen Consort (starting 15 July, until 30 September 1544)
 Lord Protector – Edward Seymour, 1st Duke of Somerset (starting 4 February 1547, until 11 October 1549)
 Parliament – 7th of King Henry VIII (until 24 July 1540), 8th of King Henry VIII (starting 16 January 1542, until 28 March 1544), 9th of King Henry VIII (starting 23 November 1545, until 31 January 1547), 1st of King Edward VI (starting 4 November 1547)

Events
 1540
 January – Shap Abbey and Dunstable Priory are closed down as part of the Dissolution of the Monasteries.
 1 January – King Henry VIII meets Anne of Cleves in person for the first time, informally at Rochester.
 2 January – Gloucester Abbey is surrendered to the Crown as part of the Dissolution of the Monasteries.
 6 January – King Henry VIII marries Anne of Cleves, his fourth Queen consort.
 14 January – Southwark Priory in London is surrendered to the Crown as part of the Dissolution of the Monasteries.
 29 January – Bolton Abbey, a Yorkshire priory, is closed down as part of the Dissolution of the Monasteries.
 16 February – Thetford Priory is closed down as part of the Dissolution of the Monasteries.
 23 March – Waltham Abbey is the last abbey to close as part of the Dissolution of the Monasteries.
 April – the cathedral priories of Canterbury and Rochester are transformed into secular cathedral chapters, concluding the Dissolution of the Monasteries.
 9 July – Henry divorces Anne of Cleves.
 28 July – Thomas Cromwell is executed on order from the king on charges of treason in public on Tower Hill, London. Henry marries his fifth wife, Catherine Howard, on the same day at Oatlands Palace.
 Summer – Council of the West last sits.
 17 September – Anglican Diocese of Westminster created.
 Statute of Wills makes it possible to dispose of real estate by will.
 "Big Sun Year": Great heat and drought.
 Regius Professorships endowed at the University of Cambridge.
 Publication of The Byrth of Mankynde, the first printed book in English on obstetrics, and one of the first published in England to include engraved plates.
 1541
 18 June – by the Crown of Ireland Act, the Parliament of Ireland declares King Henry VIII of England and his heirs to be Kings of Ireland, replacing the Lordship of Ireland with the Kingdom of Ireland.
 Early summer – Collyer's School opens to scholars in Horsham.
 14 August – Anglican Diocese of Chester created.
 3 September – the Anglican Diocese of Gloucester is created from part of the Diocese of Worcester with John Wakeman (last Abbot of Tewkesbury) as first Bishop of Gloucester.
 Anglican Diocese of Peterborough formed.
 Unlawful Games Act prohibits "Several new devised Games" as part of the promotion of archery.
 Berkhamsted School founded by John Incent, Dean of St Paul's.
 The King's School, Canterbury, King's School, Chester, The King's School, Ely, King's School, Gloucester, The King's (The Cathedral) School, Peterborough, King's School, Rochester and King's School, Worcester are established (or re-endowed) by Henry VIII.
 John Brooke and Sons established at Armitage Bridge in West Yorkshire as textile manufacturers; the business will still exist in family hands into the 21st century.
 1542
 13 February – Catherine Howard, the fifth wife of Henry VIII, is executed in the Tower of London for adultery.
 4 June – the Anglican Diocese of Bristol is created from part of the newly formed Diocese of Gloucester with Paul Bush as first Bishop of Bristol.
 24 August – Battle of Haddon Rig: Scottish victory over the English.
 4 September – earliest recorded Preston Guild Court in the modern sequence, which lasts unbroken until 1922.
 September – Anglican Diocese of Oxford formed.
 24 November – Battle of Solway Moss: English victory over the Scots.
 Witchcraft Act first defines witchcraft as a felony, punishable by death (repealed 1547).
 Muster rolls are compiled in the counties.
 1543
 11 February – Henry allies with Emperor Charles V against France.
 March – Consolidating Act of Welsh Union: Parliament establishes counties and regularises parliamentary representation in Wales.
 1 July – Treaty of Greenwich between England and Scotland (repudiated by Scotland 11 December).
 12 July – King Henry VIII marries his sixth and final wife, Catherine Parr, at Hampton Court Palace.
 4 August – three Protestant Windsor Martyrs suffer death by burning. 
 Thomas Tallis becomes a Gentleman of the Chapel Royal.
 1544
 March – Third Succession Act, reinstating Princesses Mary and Elizabeth to the line of succession to the English throne, given Royal Assent (having been passed by Parliament in July 1543).
 April – posthumous publication of Cardinal John Fisher's Psalmi seu precationes in the original and in an anonymous English translation by its sponsor, Queen Catherine Parr.
 3 May – Edward Seymour, Earl of Hertford captures Leith and Edinburgh from Scotland, start of the first major campaign in the Rough Wooing.
 19 July–18 September – Italian War of 1542–1546: Henry VIII leads the First Siege of Boulogne in France.
 Thomas Cranmer's "Exhortation and Litany" is issued, the first officially authorised vernacular church service in English.
 Second programme of construction of Device Forts for defence of the Solent is ordered.
 The Great Debasement of English coinage begins.
 1545
 27 February – Scottish victory over the English at the Battle of Ancrum Moor.
 29 May – publication of Catherine Parr's Prayers or Meditations, the first book published by an English queen under her own name, and the King's Primer, another devotional work overseen by her.
 July – Italian Wars: Attempted French invasion of the Isle of Wight.
 18–19 July – Battle of the Solent between English and French fleets. On 19 July, Henry VIII's flagship, the Mary Rose, sinks.
 c.21 July – Battle of Bonchurch on the Isle of Wight: The French are defeated.
 Sir Thomas Cawarden becomes the first Master of the Revels to be head of an independent office.
 Roger Ascham's Toxophilus, the first book on archery written in English, is published.
 Thomas Phaer's The Boke of Chyldren, the first book on paediatrics written in English, is published.
 First published edition of Sir John Fortescue's De laudibus legum Angliae (written c.1471).
 1546
 24 April – Navy Board established.
 7 June – Treaty of Ardres ends the Italian War of 1542–1546; Henry VIII promises eventual return of Boulogne to France.
 4 November – Christ Church, Oxford, refounded as a college by Henry VIII under this name.
 19 December – Trinity College, Cambridge, founded by Henry VIII.
 Regius Professorship of Hebrew at the University of Oxford established by Henry VIII.
 1547
 19 January – execution of Henry Howard, Earl of Surrey, for treason.
 28 January – King Henry VIII dies at the Palace of Whitehall and is succeeded by his 9-year-old son Edward VI as King.
 31 January – Edward Seymour becomes regent of England.
 20 February – Edward VI is crowned at Westminster Abbey.
 4 April – Catherine Parr, widow of King Henry VIII, secretly marries Thomas Seymour, 1st Baron Seymour of Sudeley.
 10 September – Battle of Pinkie: An English army under Edward Seymour, now the Duke of Somerset, defeats a Scottish army under James Hamilton, 2nd Earl of Arran, the Regent. The English seize Edinburgh.
 Edward Seymour begins the construction of Somerset House, London.
 Treason Act makes it high treason to interrupt the line of succession to the throne established by the Act of Succession; and requires two witnesses to prove a charge of treason.
Six Articles repealed.
 Dissolution of Colleges Act allows St Stephen's Chapel in the Palace of Westminster to become the meeting place of the House of Commons of England.
 King James's School, Almondbury, West Yorkshire, founded as a chantry school.
 1548
 Dissolution of collegiate churches and chantries:
Beverley Minster in Yorkshire is suppressed as a collegiate church on Easter Sunday.
 Howden Minster in Yorkshire is suppressed as a collegiate church.
 Destruction of the religious colleges of Glasney and Crantock in Cornwall end the formal scholarship that has helped sustain the Cornish language and cultural identity.
 King's School, Pontefract, re-founded.
 Clergy Marriage Act 1548 removes bars to clerical marriage.
 John Bale writes Kynge Johan, the earliest English historical drama.
 Edward Hall's The Union of the Two Noble and Illustre Families of Lancastre and Yorke ("Hall's Chronicle") is published posthumously.
 1549
 15 January – Act of Uniformity imposes the Book of Common Prayer.
 9 June
 Book of Common Prayer (The Booke of the Common Prayer) introduced in churches.
 Prayer Book Rebellion against the Book of Common Prayer breaks out at Sampford Courtenay in Devon and in Cornwall.
 July – Kett's Rebellion in Norfolk against land enclosures; rebellion in Oxfordshire against landowners associated with religious changes.
 6 August – Prayer Book Rebellion: Battle of Clyst Heath – John Russell, 1st Earl of Bedford defeats rebels.
 8 August – France declares war on England.
 9 August – England declares war on France.
 17 August – Battle of Sampford Courtenay: Prayer Book rebellion quashed.
 26 August – Battle of Dussindale, near Norwich: Kett's Rebellion quashed.
 10 October – Edward Seymour, 1st Duke of Somerset loses the position of Lord Protector, John Dudley, Earl of Warwick assumes his powers but does not acquire the title.
 5 December – Cardinal Reginald Pole receives 26 votes at the Papal conclave, only two short of the requisite two-thirds majority to be elected as Pope.
 December – Sternhold and Hopkins Psalter is published.
 Putting away of Books and Images Act 1549 passed.
 The spire of Lincoln Cathedral is blown down.

Births
 1540
 24 January – Edmund Campion, Jesuit and Roman Catholic martyr (died 1581)
 25 February – Henry Howard, 1st Earl of Northampton, courtier and scholar (died 1614)
 c. February or March – Sir Francis Drake, explorer and soldier (died 1596)
 11 June – Barnabe Googe, poet (died 1594)
 William Byrd, composer (died 1623)
 George Hastings, Earl of Huntingdon, nobleman (died 1604)
 Christopher Hatton, politician (died 1591)
 1541
 Walter Devereux, 1st Earl of Essex, nobleman (died 1576)
 1542
 5 May – Thomas Cecil, 1st Earl of Exeter, politician (died 1623)
 6 June – Richard Grenville, soldier and explorer (died 1591)
 1543
 8 November – Lettice Knollys, lady-in-waiting to Queen Elizabeth I (died 1634)
 Thomas Deloney, novelist and balladeer (died 1600)
 Douglas Sheffield, Baroness Sheffield, née Howard, lover of Robert Dudley, Earl of Leicester (died 1608)
 1544
 April – Thomas Fleming, judge (died 1613)
 24 May – William Gilbert, scientist (died 1603)
 Richard Bancroft, Archbishop of Canterbury (died 1610)
 Thomas Hobson, carrier and origin of the phrase "Hobson's choice" (died 1631)
 John Knewstub, Puritan (died 1624)
 George Whetstone, writer (died 1587)
 1545
 2 March – Thomas Bodley, diplomat and library founder (died 1613)
 Nicholas Breton, poet and novelist (died 1626)
 John Field, Puritan clergyman and controversialist (died 1588)
 John Gerard, botanist (died 1612)
 1546
 13 June – Tobias Matthew, archbishop of York (died 1628)
 24 June – Robert Persons, Jesuit priest (died 1610)
 Thomas Digges, astronomer (died 1595)
 1547
Peter Bales, calligrapher (died 1610)
 George Carey, Baron Hunsdon, politician (died 1603)
 Richard Stanyhurst, translator of Virgil (died 1618)
 1548
 William Stanley, soldier (died 1630)
 1549
 12 July – Edward Manners, Earl of Rutland (died 1587)
 30 November – Sir Henry Savile, educator (died 1622)
 John Rainolds, scholar and Bible translator (died 1607)

Deaths
 1540
 c. January – Elizabeth Blount, mistress of King Henry VIII (born 1502)
 28 July – Thomas Cromwell, 1st Earl of Essex, statesman (executed) (born c. 1485)
 30 July
 Thomas Abel, priest (martyred) (born c. 1497)
 Robert Barnes, reformer (martyred) (born 1495)
 1541
 27 May – Margaret Pole, Countess of Salisbury, courtier (executed) (born 1473)
 24 November – Margaret Tudor, daughter of King Henry VII and queen of James IV of Scotland (born 1489)
 10 December – Thomas Culpeper, courtier (executed) (year of birth unknown)
 1542
 13 February – Catherine Howard, fifth wife of King Henry VIII (executed) (born c. 1522)
 3 March – Arthur Plantagenet, 1st Viscount Lisle, illegitimate son of King Edward IV (year of birth unknown 1461–1475)
 6 October – Thomas Wyatt, poet and diplomat (born 1503)
 1543
 19 July – Mary Boleyn, mistress of Kings Francis I of France and Henry VIII of England (born 1500)
 20 September – Thomas Manners, 1st Earl of Rutland (born 1492)
 October/November – Hans Holbein the Younger, painter (born c. 1497 in Germany)
 Margaret Lee, lady-in-waiting, sister of poet Thomas Wyatt (born 1506)
 1544
 30 April – Thomas Audley, 1st Baron Audley of Walden, Lord Chancellor (born 1488)
 1545
 April/October – William Latimer, churchman and scholar (born c. 1467)
 May – Agnes Howard, Duchess of Norfolk, noblewoman (born c. 1477)
 24 August – Charles Brandon, 1st Duke of Suffolk, politician and husband of Mary Tudor (born c. 1484)
 18 October – John Taverner, composer (born c. 1490)
 1546
 26 March – Thomas Elyot, diplomat and scholar (born c. 1490)
 16 July – Anne Askew, Protestant (burned at the stake) (born 1521)
 1547
 19 January – Henry Howard, Earl of Surrey, nobleman, politician and poet (executed) (born c.1517)
 28 January – King Henry VIII (born 1491)
 c. May – Edward Hall, chronicler and lawyer (born c.1496)
 October or November – John Redford, composer, poet and playwright (born c. 1500)
 1548
 7 September – Catherine Parr, queen of Henry VIII (born c. 1512)
 1549
 10 March – Thomas Seymour, 1st Baron Seymour of Sudeley, politician and diplomat (born 1508)
 April – Andrew Boorde, traveller (born 1490)
 15 April – Henry Somerset, Earl of Worcester (born 1496)
 7 December – Robert Kett, rebel (executed) (year of birth unknown)

References